Šestanovac is a municipality in Croatia in the Split-Dalmatia County. It has a population of 2,685 (2001 census), 99% of which are Croats.

Šestanovac municipality divided into three villages: Žeževica, Katuni-Kreševo and Grabovac.

Populated places in Split-Dalmatia County
Municipalities of Croatia